Time On My Hands is a 1932 American Screen Songs animated short, produced by Fleischer Studios and directed by Dave Fleischer. The song featured in this Screen Song, "Time on My Hands," was a popular song which was published in 1930.

Summary
A fisherman deals with rebellious worms, a diver flirts with a Betty Boop-like mermaid who becomes Ethel Merman, singing the title song in live-action followed by the Bouncing Ball.

External links
 Time on My Hands (film), imdb.com; accessed August 9, 2015.
 Time on My Hands (film), bcdb.com; accessed August 9, 2015.

1931 films
Betty Boop cartoons
American musical films
Animated musical films
1930s American animated films
Articles containing video clips
American black-and-white films